Moldova participated at the inaugural edition of the European Games in 2015.

Medal tables

Medals by games

Medals by sports

List of medallists

See also
 Moldova at the Olympics

References